Žerůtky may refer to:

 Žerůtky (Znojmo District), a village in the Czech Republic
 Žerůtky (Blansko District), a village in the Czech Republic